Marcel Grignon (November 9, 1914 – June 6, 1990) was a French cinematographer.

Selected filmography
 Latin Quarter (1939)
 The Blue Veil (1942)
 The Eleventh Hour Guest (1945)
 Women's Games (1946)
 The Lost Village (1947)
 The Seventh Door (1947)
 The Murdered Model (1948)
 Five Red Tulips (1949)
 Cage of Girls (1949)
 Forbidden to the Public (1949)
 Millionaires for One Day (1949)
 Quay of Grenelle (1950)
 Adventures of Captain Fabian (1951)
 My Husband Is Marvelous (1952)
 Women Are Angels (1952) 
 The Slave (1953)
 Quay of Blondes (1954)
 Cadet Rousselle (1954)
 Four Days in Paris (1955)
 It Happened in Aden (1956)
 Love in Jamaica (1957)
 Prey for the Shadows (1961)
 Vice and Virtue (1961)
 Destination Rome (1963)
 Greed in the Sun (1964)
 OSS 117 Mission for a Killer (1965)
 Is Paris Burning? (1966)
 Impossible Is Not French (1974)

References

Bibliography
 Greco, Joseph. The File on Robert Siodmak in Hollywood, 1941-1951. Universal-Publishers, 1999.

External links

1914 births
1990 deaths
Cinematographers from Paris